Wen Xisen (born March 1945) is a lieutenant general (zhongjiang) of the People's Liberation Army (PLA) who served as president of the National University of Defense Technology from 1996 to 2008. He was an alternate member of the 16th Central Committee of the Chinese Communist Party. He was a member of the 11th National Committee of the Chinese People's Political Consultative Conference.

Biography
Wen was born in Changshu, Jiangsu, in 1945, during the Republic of China. He joined the Chinese Communist Party (CCP) in February 1966, and entered the workforce in September 1968. During the Cultural Revolution, he was a technician at Lanzhou Bearing Factory between April 1970 and September 1978. After resuming the college entrance examination in 1978, he was admitted to Xi'an Jiaotong University, majoring in mechanical control. After graduation in 1981, he joined the faculty of National University of Defense Technology. He was promoted to associate professor in December 1986, becoming deputy dean of Graduate School in August 1991. After this office was terminated in July 1996, he became president of the university, serving until July 2008.

References

1945 births
Living people
People from Changshu
Xi'an Jiaotong University alumni
Academic staff of the National University of Defense Technology
Presidents of the National University of Defense Technology
People's Liberation Army generals from Jiangsu
People's Republic of China politicians from Jiangsu
Chinese Communist Party politicians from Jiangsu
Alternate members of the 16th Central Committee of the Chinese Communist Party
Members of the Standing Committee of the 11th Chinese People's Political Consultative Conference